The Droste effect, known in art as an example of mise en abyme, is the effect of a picture recursively appearing within itself, in a place where a similar picture would realistically be expected to appear. This produces a loop which in theory could go on forever, but in practice only continues as far as the image's resolution allows.

The effect is named after a Dutch brand of cocoa, with an image designed by Jan Misset in 1904. It has since been used in the packaging of a variety of products. The effect is seen in the Dutch artist M. C. Escher's 1956 lithograph Print Gallery, which portrays a gallery that depicts itself. Apart from advertising, the Droste effect is displayed in the model village at Bourton-on-the-Water: this contains a model of itself, with two further iterations. The effect has been a motif, too, for the cover of many comic books, where it was especially popular in the 1940s.

Effect

Origins 

The Droste effect is named after the image on the tins and boxes of Droste cocoa powder which displayed a nurse carrying a serving tray with a cup of hot chocolate and a box with the same image, designed by Jan Misset. This familiar image was introduced in 1904 and maintained for decades with slight variations from 1912 by artists including Adolphe Mouron. The poet and columnist Nico Scheepmaker introduced wider usage of the term in the late 1970s.

Mathematics 

The appearance is recursive: the smaller version contains an even smaller version of the picture, and so on. Only in theory could this go on forever, as fractals do; practically, it continues only as long as the resolution of the picture allows, which is relatively short, since each iteration geometrically reduces the picture's size.

Medieval art 

The Droste effect was anticipated by Giotto early in the 14th century, in his Stefaneschi Triptych. The altarpiece portrays in its centre panel Cardinal Giacomo Gaetani Stefaneschi offering the triptych itself to St. Peter. There are also several examples from medieval times of books featuring images containing the book itself or window panels in churches depicting miniature copies of the window panel itself.

M. C. Escher 

The Dutch artist M. C. Escher made use of the Droste effect in his 1956 lithograph Print Gallery, which portrays a gallery containing a print which depicts the gallery, each time both reduced and rotated, but with a void at the centre of the image. The work has attracted the attention of mathematicians including Hendrik Lenstra. They devised a method of filling in the artwork's central void in an additional application of the Droste effect by successively rotating and shrinking an image of the artwork.

Advertising 

In the 20th century, the Droste effect was used to market a variety of products. The packaging of Land O'Lakes butter featured a Native American woman holding a package of butter with a picture of herself. Morton Salt similarly made use of the effect. The cover of the 1969 vinyl album Ummagumma by Pink Floyd shows the band members sitting in various places, with a picture on the wall showing the same scene, but the order of the band members rotated. The logo of The Laughing Cow cheese spread brand pictures a cow with earrings. On closer inspection, these are seen to be images of the circular cheese spread package, each bearing the image of the laughing cow. 
The Droste effect is a theme in Russell Hoban's children's novel, The Mouse and His Child, appearing in the form of a label on a can of "Bonzo Dog Food" which depicts itself.

Model village 

A three-dimensional example of the Droste Effect can be seen in Bourton-on-the-Water, England. A model of the village was built within the village in the 1930s at a 1:9 scale, using traditional building materials. It contains within it a model of itself, which in turn includes a further smaller model, and then an even smaller model within that.

Comic books 
The Droste effect has been a motif for the cover of comic books for many years, known as an "infinity cover".  Such covers were especially popular during the 1940s. Examples include Batman #8 (December 1941–January 1942), Action Comics #500 (October 1979), and Bongo Comics Free For All! (2007 ed.). Little Giant Comics #1 (July 1938) is said to be the first-published example of an infinity cover.

See also 

 Beyond the Infinite Two Minutes, a movie prominently incorporating the effect
 Chinese boxes
 Dream within a dream
 Fractal
 Homunculus argument
 Infinity mirror
 Infinite regress
 Matryoshka doll
 Quine
 Scale invariance
 Self-similarity
 Story within a story § Fractal fiction
 Video feedback

Notes

References

External links 

 Escher and the Droste effect
 The Math Behind the Droste Effect (article by Jos Leys summarizing the results of the Leiden study and article)
 Droste Effect with Mathematica
 Droste Effect from Wolfram Demonstrations Project

Artistic techniques
Recursion
Symmetry